Donji Tovarnik is a village in Serbia. It is situated in the Pećinci municipality, in the Srem District, Vojvodina province. The village has a Serb ethnic majority and its population numbering 1,016 people (2002 census).

See also

List of places in Serbia
List of cities, towns and villages in Vojvodina

Populated places in Syrmia
Populated places in Srem District
Pećinci